Events from the year 1928 in Romania. The year was dominated by the Great Depression in Romania. It also saw the first radio transmission in the country.

Incumbents
 King: Michael I. 
 Prime Minister:
 Vintilă Brătianu (until 9 November)
 Iuliu Maniu (from 10 November)

Events
 4 February – Romania enacts legislation to limit the trafficking and use of cannabis and narcotic drugs.
 15 July – The Socialist Workers Party of Romania, (PSMR) is founded.
 29 July – The newspaper Proletarul (Proletarian) is founded.
 1 November – The Romanian Radio Broadcasting Company broadcasts for the first time.
 9 November – The government of Vintilă I. C. Brătianu is replaced by the first cabinet of Iuliu Maniu that takes over the following day.
 12 December – In the general election, the National Peasants' Party retains power.
 Unknown – The first Romanian Girl Guide groups are formed. There are none left after ten years.

Births
 19 February – Cabiria Andreian Cazacu, mathematician (died 2018).
 16 April – Radu Ciuceanu, historian and politician (died 2022).
 18 May – Zlata Tkach, composer (died 2006).
 26 July – Constantin Corduneanu, mathematician (died 2018).
 30 September – Elie Wiesel, Nobel Prize laureate (died 2016).
 3 November – Ion Dincă, politician and Mayor of Bucharest (died 2007).
 11 November – Mircea Mureșan, film director (died 2020).

Deaths
 24 May – Constantin Hârjeu, engineer (born 1856).
 29 December – Adele Zay, feminist and pedagogue (born 1848).

References

Years of the 20th century in Romania
1920s in Romania
 
Romania
Romania